Corymbia dallachiana commonly known as Dallachy's ghost gum or Dallachy's gum, is a species of tree that is endemic to Queensland. It has smooth bark, lance-shaped or curved adult leaves, flower buds usually in groups of three, white flowers and cup-shaped, cylindrical or barrel-shaped fruit.

Description
It has smooth white to cream-coloured and pinkish bark that is shed in thin patches. Sometimes there is a short stocking of rough grey bark at the base of the trunk. Flowering has been observed in November and December and the flowers are white.

Taxonomy and naming
Dallachy's ghost gum was first formally described in 1867 by George Bentham who gave it the name Eucalyptus tessellaris var. dallachiana and published the description in Flora Australiensis. In 1995 Kenneth Hill and Lawrence Alexander Sidney Johnson raised the variety to species status as Corymbia dallachiana in the journal Telopea. The specific epithet (dallachiana) honours John Dallachy.

Distribution and habitat
Corymbia dallachiana grows in grassy woodland on plains and on creek levees east of a line from Coen to Jericho and south from Bathurst Bay to Rockhampton and Emerald.

Conservation status
This eucalypt is classified as of "least concern" under the Queensland Government Nature Conservation Act 1992.

References

Trees of Australia
dallachiana
Myrtales of Australia
Flora of Queensland
Drought-tolerant trees
Plants described in 1867